Furcifer major is a species of chameleon found in Madagascar.

References

Furcifer
Reptiles of Madagascar
Reptiles described in 1971
Taxa named by Édouard-Raoul Brygoo